Perry Township is a township in Armstrong County, Pennsylvania, United States. The population was 367 at the 2020 census, an increase over the figure of 352 tabulated in 2010.

Geography
Perry Township is located in northern Armstrong County, between the west bank of the Allegheny River and the western county boundary. It is bordered to the north by the city of Parker.

Recreation
A portion of the Pennsylvania State Game Lands Number 105 is located in Perry Township, at the confluence of Birch Run with the Allegheny River.

Demographics

As of the census of 2000, there were 404 people, 154 households, and 119 families residing in the township.  The population density was 26.9 people per square mile (10.4/km2).  There were 263 housing units at an average density of 17.5/sq mi (6.8/km2).  The racial makeup of the township was 99.75% White, and 0.25% from two or more races. Hispanic or Latino of any race were 0.25% of the population.

There were 154 households, out of which 32.5% had children under the age of 18 living with them, 64.3% were married couples living together, 9.1% had a female householder with no husband present, and 22.7% were non-families. 19.5% of all households were made up of individuals, and 7.8% had someone living alone who was 65 years of age or older.  The average household size was 2.62 and the average family size was 2.92.

The township median age of 39 years was slightly less than the county median age of 40 years. The distribution by age group was 24.5% under the age of 18, 5.4% from 18 to 24, 30.7% from 25 to 44, 25.5% from 45 to 64, and 13.9% who were 65 years of age or older.  The median age was 39 years. For every 100 females there were 98.0 males.  For every 100 females age 18 and over, there were 108.9 males.

The median income for a household in the township was $32,083, and the median income for a family was $40,469. Males had a median income of $31,250 versus $26,250 for females. The per capita income for the township was $22,784.  About 11.1% of families and 11.8% of the population were below the poverty line, including 11.0% of those under age 18 and 3.8% of those age 65 or over.

Education
Karns City Area School District - public schools
Karns City High School in neighboring Butler County

History
Perry Township appears in the 1876 Atlas of Armstrong County, Pennsylvania.

Cemeteries
Crawford Cemetery
Robinson Cemetery
Saints Peter and Paul Cemetery
Shakley Cemetery
Walley Cemetery

References

Populated places established in 1796
Townships in Armstrong County, Pennsylvania
1845 establishments in Pennsylvania